"Like a Stone" is a song by the American rock supergroup Audioslave, released as the second single from their eponymous debut studio album Audioslave in January 2003. The song topped both the Billboard Hot Mainstream Rock Tracks and Hot Modern Rock Tracks charts, and reached number 31 on the Hot 100 chart, making it their biggest US hit. "Like a Stone" has been certified Gold by the Recording Industry Association of America (RIAA). It became the fifth best performing alternative song on the Alternative Songs chart of the decade and the eighth best performing rock song on the Mainstream Rock chart of the decade.

Background and composition
Bassist Tim Commerford claims that the song is about an old man waiting for death, who sits in a house alone after all his friends and family have passed on, waiting to be reunited with them. However, while Commerford originally thought it was a song about love and romance, band's singer and songwriter Chris Cornell explains that "It's a song about concentrating on the afterlife you would hope for, rather than the normal monotheistic approach: You work really hard all your life to be a good person and a moral persona and fair and generous, and then you go to hell anyway."

The melancholy tone and certain parts of the lyrics of "Like a Stone" have prompted some to wonder if Cornell wrote the song about the late Alice in Chains singer Layne Staley, who died in April 2002. Cornell has denied this, saying "No. I'm not one of those guys where, like, something happens and then I go run around, 'Ooh, 9/11, and now it's 9/12, let me write about that. I wrote the lyrics before he died. [...] You can misinterpret that stuff pretty easy, but I don't tend to sit down and plan on writing about a specific issue. They come up or they don't."

Music video
The music video for "Like a Stone" was written and directed by Grammy winner Meiert Avis, who has also directed videos for State Radio, U2, Bruce Springsteen, Bob Dylan, J-Lo and many others. The video was produced by Oualid Mouaness, edited by Jim Rhoads and set in an old Spanish mansion in Silver Lake in Los Angeles where Jimi Hendrix once lived and wrote. Commerford's then 1-year-old son, Xavier was featured in the video. It shows the band performing inside the mansion where they also set up a recording booth. According to Avis, the strange green/blue color palette of the video was to suggest bruising and abuse.

As of October 9, 2022, the music video has reached over 1 billion views on YouTube.

UK CD single: track listing
A CD single version of "Like A Stone" released in the United Kingdom in 2003 contained the following tracks. All lyrics written by Chris Cornell; all music composed by Audioslave, except "Super Stupid" written by George Clinton, Eddie Hazel, Billy Bass Nelson and Tawl Ross.
"Like a Stone" – 4:54  
"Like a Stone"  – 4:58  
"Gasoline"  – 4:45  
"Set It Off"  – 4:01  
"Super Stupid" 
"Like a Stone"

Charts

Weekly charts

Year-end charts

Certifications

References

External links

2003 singles
2002 songs
Audioslave songs
Songs written by Chris Cornell
Song recordings produced by Chris Cornell
Song recordings produced by Rick Rubin
Songs about death
Epic Records singles
Interscope Records singles
Music videos directed by Meiert Avis